The 1951 Little All-America college football team is composed of college football players from small colleges and universities who were selected by the Associated Press (AP) as the best players at each position. For 1951, the AP changed its procedure by selecting three separate groups: a first team, a defensive platoon, and a second team.

First team

Offense
 Back - Robert Miller, Emory & Henry
 Back - Robert Flanagan, St. Ambrose
 Back - Joe Pahr, Valparaiso
 Back - Ralph Di Micco, Alfred
 End - Dale Bruce, Ohio Wesleyan
 End - Haldo Norman, Gustavus Adolphus
 Tackle - Lester Wheeler, Abilene Christian
 Tackle - Robert Williamson, San Francisco
 Guard - William Chal, Emporia
 Guard - William Dawkins, Florida State
 Center - James Hazlette, Susquehanna

Defensive platoon
 End - Jack Wilson, Randolph-Macon
 End - James Terry, Stephen Austin
 Tackle - George Young, Bucknell
 Tackle - Chester Lagod, Chattanooga
 Guard - Charles Salmon, Williams
 Guard - Vic Makovitch, Western Maryland
 Linebacker - Tito Carinci, Xavier
 Linebacker - Ken Spencer, St. Lawrence
 Back - Jack Beeler, Wofford
 Back - Norman Hash, Western Washington
 Back - Ray Renfro, North Texas State

Second team
 Back - Robert Heimerdinger, Northern Illinois
 Back - Andy Macdonald, Central Michigan
 Back - Robert White, NM Western
 Back - Walter Kohanowich, Hofstra
 End - Bernard Calendar, Louisiana College
 End - Holland Aplin, Tampa
 Tackle - Sal Gero, Elon
 Tackle - Nick Bova, Lebanon Valley
 Guard - Peter Pocius, Maine
 Guard - Skippy Jobson, Trinity (TX)
 Center - Gerald Wenzel, St. Joseph’s (IN)

See also
 1951 College Football All-America Team

References

Little All-America college football team
Little All-America college football teams